NCEW may refer to:

National Confederation of Eritrean Workers
National Conference of Editorial Writers